Lallan Prasad Singh ICS (1912 – 17 October 1998) was Governor of Assam (1973–80), Manipur (1973–80, 1982–83), Meghalaya (1973–80), Nagaland (1973–81), and Tripura (1973–80).

He was awarded Padma Vibhushan award in 1999 after his death.

He was born in Buxar, Bihar, India, in 1912 and died in New Delhi on 17 October 1998. A member of the 1936 batch of the Indian Civil Service, he joined the ICS on 9 September 1936. After independence in 1947, he had a long and distinguished career in the civil service. L.P. Singh was Chief Secretary to the government of Bihar in the first post-independence government (1946–61). He also served briefly as the Finance Secretary to the government of Bihar. He enjoyed the confidence of both the first Bihar Chief Minister Dr S K Singh & deputy Chief Minister cum Finance Minister Dr Anugrah Narain Sinha. He also held several posts including Home Secretary of India, Governor of the five North Eastern States and Indian Ambassador to Nepal.

Apart from his bureaucratic career, Singh also authored two books: Portrait of Lal Bahadur Shastri: the Quintessential Gandhian and Electoral Reform in India.

He was married to Manorama Singh (née Mehta) and had four children, namely, Vineeta, Nandini, Vijay and Priyadarshini.

Gallery

See also
 Shillong Accord of 1975

References

People from Buxar district
Bihari politicians
Indian civil servants
Recipients of the Padma Vibhushan in civil service
Governors of Assam
Governors of Manipur
Governors of Meghalaya
Governors of Nagaland
Governors of Tripura
Indian Civil Service (British India) officers
1912 births
1998 deaths
Indian Home Secretaries
20th-century Indian lawyers